Tadhg Flynn (born November 1983 in Causeway, County Kerry) is an Irish sportsperson. He played hurling with Causeway, having previously played with Ahane from 2008 to 2011 and had been a member of the Limerick senior inter-county team from 2010 to 2011. He had previously played with local club Causeway and the Kerry senior inter-county team. As of the 2019-2020 season, the IT Tralee hurling team were being managed by Flynn.

Championships won

Club
 Kerry Senior Hurling Championship (1): 2019

Intercounty

Kerry
 National Hurling League Div 2A (1): 2014
 All Ireland Minor B Hurling Championship (1): 2001
 All Ireland U21 B Championship (1): 2002

Limerick
 National Hurling League Div 2 (1): 2011

College
 Fitzgibbon Cup Runner Up: 2002 (Runner Up) 2005 
 Higher Education All Star: 2005

References

External links
 http://fitzgibbon.itcarlow.ie/panel.php?p=8&c=fc 

1983 births
Living people
Ahane hurlers
Causeway hurlers
Kerry inter-county hurlers
Limerick inter-county hurlers
Hurling goalkeepers
Alumni of the University of Limerick